Dover Island an island located 1.6 km (one mile) off the shore of West Dover, Nova Scotia. It is a popular destination for a form of free rock climbing known as bouldering. It is home to over 100 bouldering problems concentrated in a tiny area ranging from V0 to V10, with many new problems yet to be discovered. It is also a vacation spot, occasionally hosting weddings.

Flora
Dover Island has 13 known rare and endangered species including one of the highest concentrations of the Slender Blue Flag Iris and it is suspected to have at least 50 rare and endangered species.

Transportation
Most locals traditionally arranged transportation to the island with a local fisherman/blacksmith named Norm, until his retirement in 2011. As of May 2012, boat service for climbers was provided by the proprietor of a local bed and breakfast, Ocean Spray B&B.

Classic Bouldering Problems
Orgasmatron (V0)
The Coffin (V2)
The Bear (V4)
Orangutan (V4)
John Doe (V4)
The Wave (V5)
Bulldog (V6)
Orange Crush (V6)
Behave (V7)
Exciter (V7)
I Heel Good (V7)
One Scoop (V8)
washed out to sea.
White Trash (V8)

Events
Climb Nova Scotia hosts Boulderfest every year on Dover Island. Boulderfest is a popular event that usually sells out within the first day of ticket sales.

Nova Scotia Climbing Related Links
Climb Nova Scotia
Halifax Bouldering
Climb Eastern Canada Webform
Pulldown Productions
Tracstarr Productions
Ground Zero Climbing Gym

References

Landforms of Halifax, Nova Scotia
Islands of Nova Scotia
Landforms of Halifax County, Nova Scotia